Offerton Green is a village in Stockport, England. The village is little more than a green surrounded by houses, closely neighbouring nearby areas of Bosden Farm and Foggbrook.

Villages in Greater Manchester
Areas of Stockport